Yaur is an ethnic group who inhabit the northern coastal area of Nabire Regency precisely in Yaur District. The area inhabited by the Yaur people is included in the Saireri customary territory which includes the northern coast of Nabire, Biak Islands, and Yapen Island.

Language

Yaur or Jaur is a language that belongs to the Cendrawasih language family (Gelvink Bay) a branch of the Austronesian spoken in Central Papua Province, Indonesia. This language has about 300 speakers.

See also

Indigenous people of New Guinea

References

Ethnic groups in Indonesia